The Daniel Donnelly House is a historic home located at Williamsport, Washington County, Maryland, United States. It is a Flemish bond brick, two-story dwelling on a prominent hill built about 1833. The house shows influence of the Federal and Greek Revival styles. Also on the property are a small garden house, shed, and summerhouse, all small late-20th century structures. The house is associated with the American Civil War Battle of Falling Waters, which took place July 13 and 14, 1863. The Civil War Sites Advisory Commission found the property to be the best preserved battlefield along the route of Robert E. Lee's retreat from Gettysburg.

The Daniel Donnelly House was listed on the National Register of Historic Places in 2003.

References

External links
, including photo in 2003, at Maryland Historical Trust

Houses on the National Register of Historic Places in Maryland
Houses in Washington County, Maryland
Houses completed in 1833
Federal architecture in Maryland
Greek Revival houses in Maryland
National Register of Historic Places in Washington County, Maryland